Marylebone West was a borough constituency located in the Metropolitan Borough of St Marylebone, in London.  It returned one Member of Parliament (MP)  to the House of Commons of the Parliament of the United Kingdom, elected by the first past the post voting system.

The constituency was created under the Redistribution of Seats Act 1885, and was formerly part of the two-seat Marylebone constituency. It was abolished for the 1918 general election.

Boundaries
The previous Parliamentary borough of Marylebone was split up in the boundary review of 1884–85. The new Parliamentary borough consisted of the parish of St Marylebone, and therefore had identical boundaries to the St Marylebone Vestry which was the main institution of local government. The Commissioners divided the parish into two Divisions, each of which contained four of the parishes' eight wards. Marylebone West division was defined as containing the Bryanston, Hamilton Terrace, New Church Street, and Portman wards. The population in 1881 was 83,871.

Members of Parliament

Election results

Elections in the 1880s 

Diggle stood in order to test the eligibility of Church of England clergyman to stand as candidates, but if he had won he would have been disqualified from sitting in the Commons.

Elections in the 1890s 

Townsend-Farquhar was elevated to the peerage.

Elections in the 1900s

Elections in the 1910s 

General Election 1914–15:

Another General Election was required to take place before the end of 1915. The political parties had been making preparations for an election to take place and by the July 1914, the following candidates had been selected; 
Unionist: Samuel Scott
Liberal:

References 

Parliamentary constituencies in London (historic)
Constituencies of the Parliament of the United Kingdom established in 1885
Constituencies of the Parliament of the United Kingdom disestablished in 1918
Politics of the City of Westminster